Bantry is a town in County Cork, Ireland.

Bantry may also refer to:
 Bantry (County Cork barony), an Irish barony centred on the town of Bantry
 Bantry (County Wexford barony), an Irish barony in County Wexford
 Bantry, North Dakota, a city in the United States
 Bantry, Alberta, a locality in Canada

 Earl of Bantry, (previously Baron Bantry and Viscount Bantry) 1800–1891 titles in the Peerage of Ireland

See also
 Bantry Bay (disambiguation)